The ilvB-OMG RNA motif is a conserved RNA structure that was discovered by bioinformatics.
ilvB-OMG motif RNAs are found in Gammaproteobacteria within the poorly studied OMG group (Microbiology).

ilvB-OMG RNAs are found upstream of genes whose protein products are involved in synthesis of branched-chain amino acids. The motif could, therefore, function as a cis-regulatory element.

References

Non-coding RNA